Jonathan I. Strietzel is an American entrepreneur, businessman, and inventor. He is known for founding various companies as well as engineering and patenting several systems and methods in telecommunications, advertising, and video gaming.

History
Jonathan Streitzel completed a bachelor's degree in Business Administration at Chapman University. In 1999 he invented systems for ring-tone advertising. He later invented one of the first storage business models. In 2001 he patented a Cloud computing system that constituted a cloud-based freemium online distribution model for music and films.
 
In 2005 he founded Clone Interactive alongside Jon Kraft and Jon Snoddy. The company later became New media firm Big Stage Entertainment and was named by Forbes as one of "America's 20 Most Promising Companies." In 2011 he founded Strietzel.Co, a software development company.

Patent lawsuit
 
In 2011 a company called Callertone Innovations LLC filed 18 lawsuits against AT&T, Verizon, Sprint Nextel, MetroPCS, T-Mobile and others for breaching two patents on ring-tone advertising. The patents, titled "Method and apparatus for selectively providing messages in telecommunications systems", included patent Nos. 7,852,995 and 7,860,225. Jonathan Strietzel was registered as inventor of the patents in question.

Patents

See also
 Jon Snoddy

References 

21st-century American businesspeople
Living people
1980 births